Central Methodist Church may refer to:

in England
 Central Methodist Church, Eastbourne, the main Methodist place of worship in Eastbourne, East Sussex
 Central Methodist Church, Lincoln, Lincolnshire
 Central Methodist Church, Nantwich, a former Wesleyan Methodist church on Hospital Street, Nantwich, Cheshire, England
 Central Methodist Church, York, the main Methodist place of worship in York

in the United States
 Hanson Place Central Methodist Church, a Methodist church in Brooklyn, New York, located on the northwest corner of Hanson Place and Saint Felix Street
Central Methodist Church (Spartanburg, South Carolina), listed on the U.S. National Register of Historic Places

See also

 Central Methodist Episcopal Church (disambiguation)
 Central Mine Methodist Church
 Central United Methodist Church (disambiguation)